Dreke is the surname of:

 Luis Dreke (born 1953), Cuban footballer
 Valentín Dreke (1898–1929), Cuban baseball outfielder in the Negro leagues
 Víctor Dreke (born 1937), Cuban Communist Party leader and soldier

See also
 Reinaldo Drake (born 1923), sometimes spelled Dreke, Cuban baseball outfielder in the Negro leagues